The European Pairs Speedway Championship is an annual speedway event held in different countries organized by the European Motorcycle Union (UEM) since 2004.

Previous winners

Rules
The minimum age limit (16 years) starts on the date of the rider's birthday.

Team composition
The 6 (or 7) competing teams shall each consist of 3 riders: 2 riders having programmed riders and the third rider being a substitute, as follows:

The substitute rider may take the place of any programmed rider, at any time, within the maximum number of permitted heats (5 when is 6 pairs and 6 when is 7 pairs) as decided by the Team Manager.

Race format

Classification

Most wins
{| width=100%
|width=33% valign=top|
Four times champion:
 Aleš Dryml, Jr. (2004, 2007, 2009, 2010)
 Lukáš Dryml (2004, 2007, 2009, 2010)

Participating nations
Legend
 – Champions.
 – Runners-up.
 – Third place.
4–12 – 4th to 20th places.
 – Final hosts.
Q – Qualified for upcoming tournament.
q – Will take part in the upcoming qualification.

See also
 Motorcycle speedway

References 

 
Pairs